Menegazzia caesiopruinosa is a species of lichen from Australia. It was described as new to science in 1987.

See also
List of Menegazzia species

References

caesiopruinosa
Lichen species
Lichens described in 1987
Lichens of Australia
Taxa named by Peter Wilfred James